Jane Frizzle (c.1600) lived in the seventeenth century in the Derwent Valley near Muggleswick Common, Edmundbyers, County Durham. She lived in a farm cottage known by the name of "Crooked Oak", situated to the north of Mosswood Banks, the birch clad "Sneep” with its rocky point, and the Badger Wood; the cottage probably getting its name from the fact that there was a gnarled oak tree in the vicinity.

The cottage was of Jacobean origin, with an ornamental doorway, surmounted by a stone lintel, carved into which was “1684” and “T” and “I.R.”, being the date the cottage was built and the initials of the owners/builders.

She appeared to live alone, and was, as such, probably wrinkled and a "little odd", which is why she was considered to be a witch by many of the local country-folk.

No one knows when she died, and the only “definite?” fact is that she lived in the seventeenth century and is thought to be buried in the corner of a field at Greenhead, near Carterway Heads.

She is mentioned in “Ode to the River Derwent”, a poem of some 40 verses  by John Carr which appears in The Bishoprick Garland of 1834 by Sir Cuthbert Sharp.

See also 
 Geordie dialect words
 Cuthbert Sharp
 The Bishoprick Garland 1834 by Sharp

References

External links
 Edmundbyers at visitoruk.com
 Frith's Historic map of Carterway Heads

People from County Durham (district)
Geordie songwriters
Northumbrian folklore
Witchcraft in England